
This is a timeline of Vietnamese history, comprising important legal and territorial changes and political events in Vietnam and its predecessor states.  To read about the background to these events, see History of Vietnam.

Prehistory / Millennia: 3rd BC2nd BC–1st BC1st–2nd3rd

Prehistoric Vietnam 

Centuries: 30th BC29th BC28th BC27th BC26th BC25th BC24th BC23rd BC22nd BC21st BC

30th century BC

29th century BC

28th century BC

27th century BC

26th century BC

25th century BC

24th century BC

23rd century BC

22nd century BC

21st century BC 

Centuries: 20th BC19th BC18th BC17th BC16th BC15th BC14th BC13th BC12th BC11th BC10th BC9th BC8th BC7th BC6th BC5th BC4th BC3rd BC2nd BC1st BC

20th century BC

19th century BC

17th century BC

16th century BC

15th century BC

14th century BC

13th century BC

12th century BC

11th century BC

10th century BC

9th century BC

8th century BC

7th century BC

6th century BC

5th century BC

4th century BC

3rd century BC

2nd century BC

1st century BC 

Centuries: 1st2nd3rd4th5th6th7th8th9th10th11th12th13th14th15th16th17th18th19th20th

1st century

2nd century

3rd century

4th century

5th century

6th century

7th century

8th century

9th century

10th century

11th century

12th century

13th century

14th century

15th century

16th century

17th century

18th century

19th century

20th century

21st century

See also
Timeline of Vietnam under Chinese rule
Timeline of early independent Vietnam
Timeline of the Lý dynasty

Notes

References 
Cao Xuân Đỉnh. Người anh hùng làng Dóng. NxbKHXH 1969.
Dao, T. T. 1985. Types of rice cultivation and its related civilization in Vietnam. East Asian Cultural Studies 24: 41—56.
Doh Chull Shin (2011).  Confucianism and Democratization in East Asia. Cambridge University Press.
Hauptly, Denis J. (1985), In Vietnam, New York.
Iwona Czerwinska Pawluk and Walery Zukow (2011). 
Jeffrey, Laura S. (2007). Celebrate Tet. Enslow Publishers, Inc.
Lê Trung Vũ & Lê Hồng Lý. Lễ hội Việt Nam. Hương Trang Cultural Company Ltd. & NXB Văn hóa Thông tin, 2005.
Mark W. McLeod & Nguyen Thi Dieu (2001). Culture and Customs of Vietnam. Greenwood Publishing Group.
McCrum, Mark (2008). Going Dutch in Beijing: How to Behave Properly When Far Away from Home. Macmillan.

Tarling, Nicholas. The Cambridge History of Southeast Asia. Cambridge University Press, 1999.
Taylor, Keith Weller, The Birth of Vietnam. University of California Press, 1991.

 
Vietnam